Adam Sušac (born 20 May 1989) is a Croatian professional footballer who plays as a centre-back for FSV Zwickau.

Club career
Born in Novi Marof, Sušac kicked off his career with Varteks in 2009 and went on to make 36 appearances for the club, which changed its name to NK Varaždin in mid 2010. He also enjoyed a loan spell at non league club Sloboda. In October 2011, he was released by the club. On 29 January 2012, he joined Rijeka on a two-year deal. In order to gain first team appearances, he joined second tier club Pomorac on loan. In July 2013, he trialled with German club Dynamo Dresden, and featured for it in a friendly against Dutch side Ajax. After a successful trial, he signed permanently with the club, penning a one-year deal.

After a short stint with Austrian club Wiener Neustadt, Sušac returned to Germany, this time by joining Erzgebirge Aue of the 3. Liga in 2015. On 1 June 2017, after having played two seasons with the club, he was released. On 8 October 2017, he signed for VfL Osnabrück of the same league.

International career
Sušac had been capped at the youth international level, featuring for Croatia under-16, Croatia under-17 and Croatia under-19.

Career statistics

References

External links
 

1989 births
Living people
People from Novi Marof
Association football central defenders
Croatian footballers
Croatia youth international footballers
NK Varaždin players
HNK Rijeka players
NK Pomorac 1921 players
Dynamo Dresden players
SC Wiener Neustadt players
FC Erzgebirge Aue players
VfL Osnabrück players
FSV Zwickau players
Croatian Football League players
First Football League (Croatia) players
2. Bundesliga players
Austrian Football Bundesliga players
3. Liga players
Croatian expatriate footballers
Expatriate footballers in Germany
Croatian expatriate sportspeople in Germany
Expatriate footballers in Austria
Croatian expatriate sportspeople in Austria